The Rubik's Revenge (also known as the 4×4×4 Rubik's Cube) is a 4×4×4 version of the Rubik's Cube. It was released in 1981. Invented by Péter Sebestény, the cube was nearly called the Sebestény Cube until a somewhat last-minute decision changed the puzzle's name to attract fans of the original Rubik's Cube. Unlike the original puzzle (and other odd-numbered puzzles like the 5×5×5 cube), it has no fixed facets: the centre facets (four per face) are free to move to different positions.

Methods for solving the 3×3×3 cube work for the edges and corners of the 4×4×4 cube, as long as one has correctly identified the relative positions of the colours—since the centre facets can no longer be used for identification.

Mechanics

The puzzle consists of 56 unique miniature cubes ("cubies") on the surface. These consist of 24 centres which show one colour each, 24 edges which show two colours each, and 8 corners which show three colours each. The original Rubik's Revenge can be taken apart without much difficulty, typically by turning one side through a 30° angle and prying an edge upward until it dislodges.

The original mechanism designed by Sebestény uses a grooved ball to hold the centre pieces in place. The edge pieces are held in place by the centres and the corners are held in place by the edges, much like the original cube. There are three mutually perpendicular grooves for the centre pieces to slide through. Each groove is only wide enough to allow one row of centre pieces to slide through it. The ball is shaped to prevent the centre pieces of the other row from sliding, ensuring that the ball remains aligned with the outside of the cube. Turning one of the centre layers moves either just that layer or the ball as well.

The Eastsheen version of the cube, which is slightly smaller at 6cm to an edge, has a completely different mechanism. Its mechanism is very similar to Eastsheen's version of the Professor's cube, instead of the ball-core mechanism. There are 42 pieces (36 movable and six fixed) completely hidden within the cube, corresponding to the centre rows on the Professor's Cube. This design is more durable than the original and also allows for screws to be used to tighten or loosen the cube. The central spindle is specially shaped to prevent it from becoming misaligned with the exterior of the cube. Nearly all manufacturers of 4×4×4 use similar mechanisms.

There are 24 edge pieces which show two coloured sides each, and eight corner pieces which show three colours. Each corner piece or pair of edge pieces shows a unique colour combination, but not all combinations are present (for example, there is no piece with both red and orange sides, if red and orange are on opposite sides of the solved Cube). The location of these cubes relative to one another can be altered by twisting the layers of the cube, but the location of the coloured sides relative to one another in the completed state of the puzzle cannot be altered: it is fixed by the relative positions of the centre squares and the distribution of colour combinations on edge and corner pieces. Edge pairs are often referred to as "," from double edges.

For most recent Cubes, the colours of the stickers are red opposite orange, yellow opposite white, and green opposite blue. However, there also exist Cubes with alternative colour arrangements (yellow opposite green, blue opposite white and red opposite orange).  The Eastsheen version has purple (opposite red) instead of orange.

Permutations

There are 8 corners, 24 edges and 24 centres.

Any permutation of the corners is possible, including odd permutations. Seven of the corners can be independently rotated, and the orientation of the eighth depends on the other seven, giving 8!×37 combinations.

There are 24 centres, which can be arranged in 24! different ways. Assuming that the four centres of each colour are indistinguishable, the number of permutations is reduced to 24!/(246) arrangements. The reducing factor comes about because there are 24 (4!) ways to arrange the four pieces of a given colour. This is raised to the sixth power because there are six colours. An odd permutation of the corners implies an odd permutation of the centres and vice versa; however, even and odd permutations of the centres are indistinguishable due to the identical appearance of the pieces. There are several ways to make the centre pieces distinguishable, which would make an odd centre permutation visible.

The 24 edges cannot be flipped, due to the internal shape of the pieces. Corresponding edges are distinguishable, since they are mirror images of each other. Any permutation of the edges is possible, including odd permutations, giving 24! arrangements, independently of the corners or centres.

Assuming the cube does not have a fixed orientation in space, and that the permutations resulting from rotating the cube without twisting it are considered identical, the number of permutations is reduced by a factor of 24. This is because all 24 possible positions and orientations of the first corner are equivalent because of the lack of fixed centres. This factor does not appear when calculating the permutations of N×N×N cubes where N is odd, since those puzzles have fixed centres which identify the cube's spatial orientation.

This gives a total number of permutations of 

The full number is  possible permutations (about  septillion, 7.4 septilliard on the long scale or 7.4 quattuordecillion on the short scale).

Some versions of the cube have one of the centre pieces marked with a logo, distinguishing it from the other three of the same colour. Since there are four distinguishable positions for this piece, the number of permutations is quadrupled, yielding 2.96×1046 possibilities. Any of the four possible positions for this piece could be regarded as correct.

Solutions
There are several methods that can be used to solve the puzzle.  One such method is the reduction method, so called because it effectively reduces the 4×4×4 to a 3×3×3.  Cubers first group the centre pieces of common colours together, then pair edges that show the same two colours.  Once this is done, turning only the outer layers of the cube allows it to be solved like a 3×3×3 cube.

Another method is the Yau method, named after Robert Yau. The Yau method is similar to the reduction method, and it is the most common method used by speedcubers. The Yau methods starts by solving two centers on opposite sides. Three cross  are then solved. Next, the four remaining centers are solved. Afterwards, any remaining  are solved. This reduces down to a 3x3x3 cube.

A method similar to the Yau method is called Hoya. It was invented by Jong-Ho Jeong. It involves the same steps as Yau, but in a different order. It starts with all centers being solved except for 2 adjacent centers. Then form a cross on the bottom, then solve the last two centers. After this, it is identical to Yau, finishing the edges, and solving the cube as a 3x3.

Parity errors

Certain positions that cannot be solved on a standard 3×3×3 cube may be reached.  There are two possible problems not found on the 3×3×3.  The first is two edge pieces reversed on one edge, resulting in the colours of that edge not matching the rest of the cubies on either face (OLL parity): 
 Notice that these two edge pieces are swapped. The second is two edge pairs being swapped with each other (PLL parity), may be two corners swapped instead depending on situation and/or method: 
  These situations are known as parity errors.  These positions are still solvable; however, special algorithms must be applied to fix the errors.

Some methods are designed to avoid the parity errors described above.  For instance, solving the corners and edges first and the centres last would avoid such parity errors. Once the rest of the cube is solved, any permutation of the centre pieces can be solved. Note that it is possible to apparently exchange a pair of face centres by cycling 3 face centres, two of which are visually identical.

PLL parity can occur on all N×N×N cubes when N is even and at least 4. It does not occur on cubes with an odd N, such as the 3×3×3 and the 5×5×5. This is due to the fact that the latter have fixed center pieces and the former do not.

Direct solving of a 4×4×4 is uncommon, but possible, with methods such as K4. Doing so mixes a variety of techniques and is heavily reliant on commutators for the final steps.

World records
The world record fastest solve is 16.86 seconds, set by Max Park of the United States on 28 November 2021 at CubingUSA Western Championship 2021 in Utah, United States.
 
The world record for fastest average of five solves (excluding fastest and slowest solves) is 19.88 seconds, also set by Max Park of the United States on 3 April 2022 at Bay Area Speedcubin' 29 PM 2022 in San Jose, California, with the times of 19.21, 21.55, (21.78), (17.81) and 18.87 seconds.

The world record for fastest blindfolded solve is 51.96 seconds (including inspection), set by Stanley Chapel of the United States on 28th January 2023 at 4BLD in a Madison Hall 2023, in Wisconsin, United States.

The record for mean of three blindfolded solves is 1 minute, 8.76 seconds (including inspection), also set by Stanley Chapel at Michigan Cubing Club Epsilon 2019, with the times of 1:02.51, 1:14.05 and 1:09.72.

Top 5 solvers by single solve

Top 5 solvers by average of 5 solves

Top 5 solvers by blindfolded solve

Top 5 solvers by blindfolded average of 3 
Note: All solves are counted. If one solve is a DNF (Did Not Finish), the average is also a DNF.

Reception
Games included Rubik's Revenge in their "Top 100 Games of 1982", finding that it helped to solve the original Rubik's Cube that the center pieces did not move, but noted "That's not true of this Supercube, which has added an extra row of subcubes in all three dimensions."

See also
 Pocket Cube (2×2×2)
 Rubik's Cube (3×3×3)
 Professor's Cube (5×5×5)
 V-Cube 6 (6×6×6)
 V-Cube 7 (7×7×7)
 V-Cube 8 (8×8×8)
 Combination puzzle

References

Further reading
 Rubik's Revenge: The Simplest Solution by William L. Mason
Speedsolving the Cube by Dan Harris, 'Rubik's Revenge' pages 100-120.
The Winning Solution to Rubik's Revenge by Minh Thai, with Herbert Taylor and M. Razid Black.

External links

 Beginner/Intermediate solution to the Rubik's Revenge by Chris Hardwick
 'K4' Method Advanced direct solving method.
 Patterns A collection of pretty patterns for Rubik's Revenge
 4x4x4 Parity Algorithms at the Speedsolving Wiki
 Program Rubik's Cube 3D Unlimited size

Rubik's Cube
Novelty items
Single-player games
1980s toys
1980s fads and trends
Ideal Toy Company